Sudan International University (SIU),  is a private university founded in 1990, and located in Khartoum, Sudan. The university has been accredited by the Sudan Ministry of Higher Education and Scientific Research.

History

Schools and colleges 
Faculty of Medicine 
Faculty of Dentistry
Faculty of Pharmacy
Faculty of Nursing
Faculty of Medical Laboratory Sciences
Faculty of Engineering
The College awards a bachelor's degree in the following majors:-
Medical Engineering - Electronic Engineering - Network and Communication Engineering - Computer Systems Engineering - Civil Engineering - Electrical Engineering (Power Systems - Control Systems) -  Architecture Engineering - Mechatronics Engineering - Mechanical Engineering 
Faculty of Computing and Information Systems
Faculty of Management Sciences
Faculty of Economics, Financial and Banking Studies
Faculty of Tourism & Hotel Management
Sudan International Language Center (SILC)
Department of Quality Assurance and Self-Evaluation

Libraries 
The university has one big library that contains approximately 6000 books from various interests of the humanities, medical and health sciences that help students to obtain information in an easy and comfortable way. The university also has an electronic library with computers that has access to internet.

Campuses
The buildings of Sudan International University are located in the state of Khartoum, where the buildings are distributed in the cities of Arquette and Al-Azhari. City of Al-Azhari has the Medical and Engineering Complex, where the buildings of Arquette include the Faculties of Tourism and Hotel and the Faculties of Computer Science and Economics, etc.

Accreditation 
Sudan Ministry of Higher Education and Scientific Research currently provides accreditation to the university.

References

Universities and colleges in Sudan
Science and technology in Sudan
Scientific organisations based in Sudan